Francis Wyndham may refer to:

 Sir Francis Wyndham, 1st Baronet (c. 1612–1676), English soldier and politician
 Francis Wyndham (judge) (died 1592), English politician
 Francis Wyndham (writer) (1924–2017), English author, literary editor and journalist
 Francis Wyndham (MP for Gloucester)